AAA California may refer to one of the following motor clubs associated with the American Automobile Association (AAA):

Automobile Club of Southern California
California State Automobile Association, in Northern California

CA